Charles Wakefield  (1834–1919) was a British artist, teacher, and museum curator.

Biography
Wakefield was born in York and privately educated, eventually attending the York School of Art. He was appointed drawing master at Elmfield College in 1864 whist holding the same post at Bootham School. In December 1870, following the reservation of William Dallas from the post, Wakefield was temporarily appointed to the post of Keeper of the Yorkshire Museum – a position he retained until 1878 when a permanent Keeper, John-Clay Purves was appointed. Wakefield also served as the first Honorary Curator of Numismatics at the museum from 1907 and served as vice-president of the Yorkshire Philosophical Society. Wakefield bequeathed £50,000 to the York Blind School and his home, Heslington House, to the York Corporation on his death.

Following his death, Wakefield's collection of coins was partially purchased by the Yorkshire Museum.

References

1834 births
British curators
1919 deaths
Yorkshire Museum people
Artists from York
British numismatists
Members of the Yorkshire Philosophical Society